Aliabad-e Chah Zar (also Romanized as ‘Alīābād-e Chah Zār; also known as ‘Alīābād) is a village in Sangan Rural District, in the Central District of Khash County, Sistan and Baluchestan Province, Iran. At the 2006 census, its population was 42, in 9 families.

References 

Populated places in Khash County